The Kalachuri dynasty (6th-7th century), also known as the Kalachuris of Mahishmati or Early Kalachuris, ruled parts of west-central India during 6th and 7th centuries.

Multiple later dynasties share this name:

 Kalachuris of Tripuri (c. 7th-13th century), also called Kalachuris of Chedi or Dahala
 Kalachuris of Ratnapura (11th-13th century), an offshoot of the Tripuri Kalachuris
 Kalachuris of Kalyani (12th century), also called Kalachuris of Kalyana or Karnataka